The Auckland Football Federation was an association football organization, responsible for the local growth and development of the game in Auckland, New Zealand. In 2020 it was merged with Auckland Football Federation into the Northern Region Football.

Staff
 Bob Patterson — Chief Executive Officer
 Steven Upfold — Chief Operations Manager
 Nic Downes — Football Development Officer
 Carol Waller — Accounts Manager
 Gordon Watson — Communications Manager
 Ben Bates — Football Development Officer
 Ben Hill — Competitions Administrator
 Paul Smith — Referee Development Officer
 Marvin Eakins — Futsal Development Officer
 Gemma Lewis — Girls' and Women's Football Development Officer

Member clubs

Bay Olympic
Beachlands Maraetai
Bucklands Beach
Central United
Clendon AFC
Clevedon FC
Drury United
Eastern Suburbs
Fencibles United
High School Old Boys
Lynn-Avon United
Mangere United
Manukau City
Manurewa
Metro FC
Mt Albert Ponsonby
Onehunga-Mangere United
Onehunga Sports
Otahuhu United AFC
Papakura City
Papatoetoe
Papatoetoe United
Pukekohe
South Auckland Rangers
Three Kings United
Tuakau SC
University-Mount Wellington
Waiheke United
Waiuku
Western Springs

References

External links

Association football in Auckland